Arthur David "Superman" Pennington (May 18, 1923 – January 4, 2017) was an all-star Negro league baseball player in the 1940s.

Pennington played for the Chicago American Giants (1941–1945, 1950), the Birmingham Black Barons (1945), as well as in the Mexican Baseball League (1946–1948), the U.S. minor league system (1949, 1952–1954, 1958-1959), and in Cuban and Venezuelan leagues.

He played in the 1942 and 1950 East-West All-Star Game.

Pennington retired from Rockwell Collins in 1985; his house was badly damaged in a 2008 flood that destroyed most of his personal baseball memorabilia.

He is included as card # 97 in the Topps 2009 Allen & Ginter baseball card nostalgia set.

References

Further reading
Figueredo, Jorge S.  (2011). Cuban Baseball: A Statistical History, 1878-1961. McFarland & Company.

External links
, or Pelota Binaria (Venezuelan Winter League), and Seamheads

1923 births
2017 deaths
African-American baseball players
American expatriate baseball players in Mexico
Angeles de Puebla players
Azules de Veracruz players
Baseball first basemen
Birmingham Black Barons players
Chicago American Giants players
Habana players
Industriales de Monterrey players
Patriotas de Venezuela players
Sportspeople from Cedar Rapids, Iowa
Sultanes de Monterrey players
Tomateros de Culiacán players
Zulu Cannibal Giants players
Bismarck Barons players
21st-century African-American people